Minnesota State Highway 24 (MN 24) is a  highway in central Minnesota, which travels from its intersection with U.S. Highway 12 (US 12) and MN 22 in Litchfield and continues northeast to its intersection with US 10 and Sherburne County Road 6 in Clear Lake.

For part of its route, MN 24 travels concurrent with MN 15 between Kingston Township and Kimball.

The section between Interstate 94 (I-94)/US 52 and US 10 is part of the National Highway System.

Route description
MN 24 serves as a northeast–southwest route in central Minnesota between Litchfield, Kimball, Annandale, Clearwater, and Clear Lake.

The route crosses the Highway 24 Bridge at the Mississippi River between Clearwater and Clear Lake.

The section of MN 24 between I-94 and US 10 experiences high volumes of traffic due to its usage as a connection between the two highways. This connection primarily serves Twin Cities traffic heading to and from communities in central Minnesota and the Brainerd Lakes Area via US 10, especially on summer weekends. As a result of the rising traffic volumes experienced on this stretch of MN 24, a new freeway has been proposed to connect I-94 and US 10 in the vicinity, but is not expected to begin construction until after 2028.

History
Highway 24 was authorized November 2, 1920 from Litchfield to St. Cloud. The roadway was fully graveled by 1927.

In 1934, State Highway 15 was extended to St. Cloud, replacing Highway 24 north of Kingston Township and assuming most of its former extent.

Highway 24 was paved from 1947 through 1949.

In 1961, Highway 24 was extended along what was previously State Highway 240 from Annandale across the Mississippi River to Clear Lake, overlapping with Highways 15 and 55 to connect to its original extent.

Highway 240 had been established July 1, 1949, and was fully paved by that time. The route number was replaced in its entirety by Highway 24.

Major intersections

See also

References

External links

 Highway 24 at the Unofficial Minnesota Highways Page

024
Transportation in Meeker County, Minnesota
Transportation in Stearns County, Minnesota
Transportation in Wright County, Minnesota
Transportation in Sherburne County, Minnesota